Ashley Neal (born 16 December 1974) is an English former professional footballer who played as a defender. He is the son of the former Liverpool player Phil Neal.

On 26 September 1996, Neal was loaned to Brighton & Hove Albion. Two days later, he made his first league appearance in a 3–0 defeat to Northampton Town.

After a free transfer to Peterborough United, Neal made nine total appearances for the club. His first game for the club was in a 2–0 victory versus Preston North End. He made his first and only FA Cup appearance versus Dagenham & Redbridge on 6 December 1997. Major injury led Neal to an early retirement from the game.

Retired from football, Neal now works as a driving instructor and YouTuber. His YouTube channel, where he analyses dashcam footage and gives advice on driving, has 133,000 subscribers as of 20 February 2023.

References

External links

1974 births
Living people
Footballers from Northampton
English footballers
Association football defenders
English Football League players
Liverpool F.C. players
Brighton & Hove Albion F.C. players
Huddersfield Town A.F.C. players
Peterborough United F.C. players